Boipelo Mashigo (born 5 April 2003) is a South African soccer player who plays as an attacking midfielder for Regionalliga Bayern side SpVgg Unterhaching.

Club career
Born in Johannesburg, Mashigo started his youth career at SuperSport United before joining DFI Bad Aibling in 2016. He remained at DFI Bad Aibling for two years before joining SpVgg Unterhaching's academy in 2018. He made his senior debut on 25 November 2020 as a half-time substitute for Alexander Fuchs in a 2–0 3. Liga defeat away to Dynamo Dresden. He made 8 appearances across the 2020–21 season.

Career statistics

References

External links
 

2003 births
Living people
South African soccer players
Soccer players from Johannesburg
Association football midfielders
SuperSport United F.C. players
SpVgg Unterhaching players
3. Liga players
South African expatriate soccer players
Expatriate footballers in Germany
South African expatriate sportspeople in Germany